SVG filter effects are effects applied to Scalable Vector Graphics (SVG) files. SVG is an open-standard XML format for two-dimensional vector graphics as defined by the World Wide Web Consortium (W3C). A filter effect consists of a series of graphics operations that are applied to a given source vector graphic to produce a modified bitmapped result.

Filter effects are defined by filter elements. The  property is set on a container element or on a graphics element to apply a filter effect to it. Each  element contains a set of filter primitives as its children. Each filter primitive performs a single fundamental graphical operation (e.g., a Gaussian blur or a lighting effect) on one or more inputs, producing a graphical result. Because most of the filter primitives represent some form of image processing, in most cases the output from a filter primitive is a single RGBA bitmap image (however, it will be regenerated if a higher resolution is called on).

The original source graphic or the result from a filter primitive can be used as input into one or more other filter primitives. A common application is to use the source graphic multiple times. For example, a simple filter could replace one graphic for two by adding a black copy of the original source graphic but offset to create a drop shadow. In effect, there are now two layers of graphics, both with the same original source graphics.

SVG filter primitives

The following table lists the filter primitives available in both SVG 1.0 and SVG 1.1. SVG Tiny does not support filter effects, while SVG Basic supports only those filter primitives shown:

The current draft of the Filter Effects Module Level 1 adds a filter primitive for drop shadow. This primitive, feDropShadow, is just a shorthand for a combination of other filter primitives.

Framework for applying a filter
<?xml version="1.0"?>
<svg xmlns="http://www.w3.org/2000/svg"
  version="1.1"
  viewBox="0 0 400 300">
  <defs>
    <filter id="AFilter">
      <!-- Definition of filter goes here -->
    </filter>
  </defs>
  <text x="10" y="100" filter="url(#AFilter)">a filter applied</text>
</svg>

External links
 W3C SVG page specifications, list of implementations
 W3C SVG primer: Filters W3C Primer (draft) chapter and examples concerning filters.
 FILDROP A set of custom SVG filter effects and generator filter effects
 SVG Filter Builder An interactive, visual SVG filter programming tool which can be used both for visualising existing filters (by uploading a SVG) but also to design your own from scratch and save them.

References

Scalable Vector Graphics